Chicken Island may refer to:

 Chicken Island (Guangdong)
 Chicken Island (Tasmania)